Naundorf is a village and a former municipality in the district Altenburger Land, in Thuringia, Germany. Since 1 December 2008, it has been part of Starkenberg.

Former municipalities in Thuringia
Altenburger Land
Duchy of Saxe-Altenburg